Route 480, also known as Burgeo Highway or The Burgeo Road, is a  north-south on southwestern Newfoundland in the Canadian province of Newfoundland and Labrador. It connects the town of Burgeo with the Trans-Canada Highway (Route 1). The highway is a winding two-lane highway traveling through remote, hilly, and wooded terrain for its entire length. There are no other communities of any kind along the highway, with thes only other intersections being abandoned logging roads. Route 480 also provides access to Sandbanks Provincial Park and ferries to the remote outports of Ramea, Grey River and Francois at its southern terminus. There are also several vacation/hunting camps along Route 480, including Peter Strides.

Route 480 also carries the designation of The Caribou Trail.

Major intersections

Route description 
The road, which is perpendicular to the Trans-Canada Highway, also has another sharp 90 degree turn where it meets the Buchans Resource Road (Route 370). 

Route 480 passes through the Annieopsquotch Mountains.

See also 
Burgeo
List of Newfoundland and Labrador highways
Sandbanks Provincial Park (Newfoundland)

References

480